Cytherellidae is a family of ostracods, Eyes are absent. It contains 11 genera: 
†Abursus Loranger, 1954
†Alveus Hamilton, 1942
†Ankumia Veen, 1932
Cytherella Jones, 1849
Cytherelloidea Alexander, 1929
†Geelongella McKenzie, Reyment & Reyment, 1991
Grammcythella Swanson et al., 2005
Inversacytherella Swanson et al., 2005
Keijcyoidea Malz, 1981
Platella Coryell & Fields, 1937
†Staringia Veen, 1936

References

External links

Ostracod families
Podocopa
Extant Jurassic first appearances